The 1955 Bulgarian Cup Final was the 15th final of the Bulgarian Cup (in this period the tournament was named Cup of the Soviet Army), and was contested between CSKA Sofia and Spartak Plovdiv on 11 December 1955 at Vasil Levski National Stadium in Sofia. CSKA won the final 5–2 after extra time.

Route to the Final

Match

Details

See also
1955 A Group

References

Bulgarian Cup finals
PFC CSKA Sofia matches
Cup Final